The Ukrainian National Chernobyl Museum (Ukrayins'kyy natsional'nyy muzey "Chornobyl'") is a history museum in Kyiv, Ukraine, dedicated to the 1986 Chernobyl disaster and its consequences. It houses an extensive collection of visual media, artifacts, scale models, and other representational items designed to educate the public about many aspects of the disaster. Several exhibits depict the technical progression of the accident, and there are also many areas dedicated to the loss of life and cultural ramifications of the disaster.

Due to the nature of the subject material, the museum provides a very visually engaging experience.

The museum occupies an early 20th-century building which formerly housed a fire brigade and was donated in 1992 by the State Fire Protection Guard.

Liquidator Remembrance Book
The museum supports the "Remembrance Book" (Knyha Pam'yati) - a unique online database of Liquidators (Chernobyl disaster management personnel some of whom sacrificed their lives) featuring personal pages with photo and brief structured information on their input. Data fields include "Radiation damage suffered", "Field of liquidation activity" and "Subsequent fate". The project started in 1997, containing over 5000 entries as of February, 2013. The database is currently available in Ukrainian language only. "Remembrance Book" is neither the only nor the complete nor official liquidators database but probably the only one open to public on the web.

Funding and patrons
The museum is founded and supported by the government of Ukraine and the local government of Kyiv. Private and foreign donations are also common. In particular, the museum has received funding from the Japanese government.

Foreign languages availability
Guided tours in English and other Western languages may be organized, and many exhibit signs have already been translated to English. Recorded audio is translated in English and other languages.

Location and public transport access
The museum is located at 1 Khoryva Lane (provulok Khoryva, 1), in historic Podil neighborhood of the city centre.

The nearest Kyiv Metro station is Kontraktova Ploshcha station on the Kontraktova Square, where stops of the various Kyiv tram, bus and marshrutka routes are also located. Car parking space near the museum is very limited.

Gallery

See also
Chernobyl Nuclear Power Plant

References

External links

Official website
 National Chernobyl Museum - museum page on the PRIPYAT.com community
 Ukraine.com listing
 Kyiv: Chernobyl Museum - article in TripAdvisor

Aftermath of the Chernobyl disaster
National museums of Ukraine
History museums in Ukraine
Museums established in 1992
1992 establishments in Ukraine
Disaster museums
Atomic tourism